Mohamed Niang (born 1976 in Dakar, Senegal) is a retired professional basketball player, who lastly played for British Basketball League rookies Everton Tigers, with whom he signed for in 2007. 
His cousin Assane Niang Faye played for University of New Hampshire  and another cousin Mouhammad Faye currently stars for the Georgia Tech basketball team.

College career
After attending the University of Reims Champagne-Ardenne in France from 1994 to 1996, the 6 ft 10 in Centre then moved to the U.S. and to the University of Delaware, where from 1996 to 1999 he played on the university's Blue Hens basketball team.

In his first season, he played 12 games, scoring five points and pulled 10 rebounds. The 1997–98 season saw him feature in 11 games, scoring nine points, pulling six rebounds and blocking two shots.

Professional career
Mohamed was a fifth round pick for the Huntsville Flight in the 2001-02 inaugural draft of the National Basketball Development League (Now called NBA D-League).

Niang most recently played in Denmark for Aalborg in 2004, averaging 22.5 pts, 9 rebounds, 2 blocks and 1.4 assists. He coached  the team the following season while recovering from ACL injury and signed up to be a player/coach for Everton Tigers during the summer of 2007.

Sources
 National Basketball Development League Announces Inaugural Draft Results
 Mohamed Niang - Sæson 2003- 2004 - Grundspillet
 Mohamed Niang er ny cheftræner hos AaB Basket

Living people
Delaware Fightin' Blue Hens men's basketball players
University of Reims Champagne-Ardenne alumni
Mersey Tigers players
Phoenix Hagen players
Senegalese men's basketball players
Senegalese expatriate basketball people in Denmark
Senegalese expatriate basketball people in the United Kingdom
Senegalese expatriate basketball people in the United States
Basketball players from Dakar
1976 births
Centers (basketball)
Power forwards (basketball)